Fait vivir is a 2019 documentary film co-produced between Colombia and Canada, directed and written by Oscar Ruiz Navia and released internationally on August 14, 2020. The film participated in events such as Bogotá International Film Festival, Biarritz Latin American Film Festival, Cali International Film Festival, Transcinema International Film Festival in Peru, Bogotá International Documentary Festival and UNAM International Film Festival in Mexico, among others.

Synopsis
A governor appears in a remote tropical town in Colombia and prohibits all forms of artistic expression such as dancing and singing. This is how Makondo was born, a work created by the Gypsy Kumbia Orchestra that brings together musicians and artists from all over the world. Manuk, a five-year-old boy, tells the story of the adventures of this picturesque group and their journey through towns and villages in Colombia plagued by armed conflict.

Cast
Manuk Aukan Mejía
Carmen Ruiz Navia
Juan Sebastián Mejía
Anina Mejía

Reception
Rodrigo Torrijos of Rolling Stone Colombia gave it a score of three and a half stars out of a possible five, stating that Fait Vivir "uses the poetry that inhabits reality and makes it dance with its doses of fantasy, looks beyond the limits of the documentary genre and creates a journey full of positivism in which it is easy to get lost".

References

External links
Contravia Films Official Website
Fait vivir at IMDb

2019 films
Colombian documentary films
Canadian documentary films
2019 documentary films
Spanish-language Canadian films
2010s Canadian films